Gary Lewis North (born 1954) is a retired United States Air Force four-star general who served as commander of Pacific Air Forces and executive director of Pacific Air Combat Operations Staff at Hickam Air Force Base, Hawaii, from August 19, 2009, to August 9, 2012. Pacific Air Forces is responsible for Air Force activities spread over half the globe in a command that supports 45,000 airmen serving principally in Hawaii, Alaska, Guam, Korea and Japan.

North was commissioned in 1976 as a distinguished graduate from East Carolina University's Air Force ROTC program. He has held numerous operational, command and staff positions, and has completed four long and four short overseas tours. The general has served two tours on the Joint Staff, serving as executive officer to the director of the Joint Staff, and as director of politico-military affairs for Asia-Pacific, where he was responsible for regional planning and policy for the Asia-Pacific, South Asia and Central Asia regions. He has served on the Air Force Staff as the chief of Joint Requirements Division and deputy director of joint matters, and as the director for operations, U.S. Pacific Command, Camp H.M. Smith, Hawaii. Prior to his last assignment, North was the commander of 9th Air Force and U.S. Air Forces Central, Shaw Air Force Base, S.C., comprising six wings in the 9th AF and eight air expeditionary wings in Air Forces Central, and served as the U.S. Central Command Combined Forces air component commander and service functional air component commander for the wars in Iraq and Afghanistan.

North has also commanded the 33rd Fighter Squadron at Shaw Air Force Base, S.C.; 35th Operations Group at Misawa Air Base, Japan; 8th Fighter Wing at Kunsan Air Base, South Korea; and the 18th Wing at Kadena AB, Japan. He is a command pilot with more than 4,500 flying hours, primarily in the F-4, F-15 and F-16. He flew 83 combat missions in Operations Desert Storm, Southern Watch, Iraqi Freedom and Enduring Freedom.

Education
 1976 Bachelor of Arts degree in political science, East Carolina University, North Carolina
 1982 Squadron Officer School, Maxwell AFB, Alabama
 1984 Master of Public Administration degree, Golden Gate University
 1986 Master of Science degree in human resource management, Golden Gate University
 1990 Armed Forces Staff College, Norfolk, Virginia
 1994 Master of Science degree in national resource strategy, Industrial College of the Armed Forces, National Defense University, Fort Lesley J. McNair, Washington, D.C.
 1997 Seminar XXI, Massachusetts Institute of Technology, Cambridge

Assignments
 September 1976 – May 1977, student, undergraduate navigator training, Mather AFB, Calif.
 May 1977 – October 1978, student, Electronic Warfare Officer School, Mather AFB, Calif.
 January 1978 – June 1978, student, F-4E upgrade training, Homestead AFB, Fla.
 July 1978 – July 1979, weapons systems officer, 35th Tactical Fighter Squadron, Kunsan AB, South Korea
 August 1979 – September 1980, F-4G Wild Weasel electronic warfare officer, 561st and 563rd tactical fighter squadrons, George AFB, Calif.
 September 1980 – September 1981, student, undergraduate pilot training, Reese AFB, Texas
 September 1981 – September 1982, fighter lead-in training, Holloman AFB, N.M., and F-16 transition, Hill AFB, Utah
 September 1982 – April 1985, squadron scheduler and squadron weapons officer, 19th Tactical Fighter Squadron, Shaw AFB, S.C.
 April 1985 – August 1985, student pilot, U.S. Air Force Fighter Weapons School, Nellis AFB, Nev.
 August 1985 – June 1986, wing weapons officer, 363rd Tactical Fighter Wing, Shaw AFB, S.C.
 June 1986 – June 1987, F-16 weapons officer and flight commander, 526th Tactical Fighter Squadron, Ramstein AB, West Germany
 June 1987 – June 1989, aide-de-camp and F-16 instructor pilot to the Commander-in-Chief of U.S. Air Forces in Europe, Ramstein AB, West Germany
 July 1989 – January 1990, student, Armed Forces Staff College, Norfolk, Va.
 March 1990 – July 1993, assistant operations officer, 19th Tactical Fighter Squadron; wing chief of standardization and evaluation, and chief of wing weapons and safety, Operation Desert Storm, 363rd Fighter Wing; and Commander, 33d Fighter Squadron, Shaw AFB, S.C.
 August 1993 – June 1994, student, Industrial College of the Armed Forces, Fort Lesley J. McNair, Washington, D.C.
 July 1994 – August 1996, commander of 35th Operations Group, Misawa AB, Japan
 August 1996 – August 1997, chief of Joint Requirements Division and deputy director of joint matters, Headquarters U.S. Air Force, Washington, D.C.
 August 1997 – May 1999, executive assistant to the director, the Joint Staff, Washington, D.C.
 May 1999 – May 2000, commander of 8th Fighter Wing, Kunsan AB, South Korea
 August 2000 – April 2002, commander of 18th Wing, Kadena AB, Japan
 April 2002 – June 2004, deputy director of politico-military affairs for Asia-Pacific, Joint Staff, the Pentagon, Washington, D.C.
 July 2004 – January 2006, director for operations, U.S. Pacific Command, Camp H.M. Smith, Hawaii
 February 2006 – August 2009, commander of 9th Air Force and U.S. Air Forces Central, Shaw AFB, S.C.
 August 2009 – August 2012, commander of Pacific Air Forces; air component commander for U.S. Pacific Command; and executive director of Pacific Air Combat Operations Staff, Hickam AFB, Hawaii

Summary of joint assignments
 August 1990 – August 1992, Desert Shield/Desert Storm Planner, Joint Credit, as a lieutenant colonel
 September 1997 – May 1999, executive officer to the director, Joint Staff, as a colonel
 April 2002 – June 2004, deputy director of politico-military affairs for Asia-Pacific (J5), Joint Staff, the Pentagon, Washington, D.C., as a brigadier general
 July 2004 – January 2006, director of operations (J3) US Pacific Command, as a major general

Flight information
Rating: Command pilot
Flight hours: More than 4,500
Aircraft flown: F-4, F-15 and F-16

Major awards and decorations

1993 Lance P. Sijan U.S. Air Force Leadership Award
2011 Order of the Sword

Promotion Dates
 Second Lieutenant September 4, 1976
 First Lieutenant September 4, 1978
 Captain September 4, 1980
 Major March 1, 1987
 Lieutenant Colonel April 1, 1990
 Colonel February 1, 1995
 Brigadier General August 1, 2001
 Major General June 1, 2005
 Lieutenant General February 16, 2006
 General August 19, 2009

References

External links

Official U.S. Air Force Biography

East Carolina University alumni
Living people
Golden Gate University alumni
Recipients of the Defense Distinguished Service Medal
Recipients of the Defense Superior Service Medal
Recipients of the Legion of Merit
Recipients of the Distinguished Flying Cross (United States)
United States Air Force generals
1954 births
Recipients of the Air Medal
Recipients of the Order of the Sword (United States)
People from Charlottesville, Virginia
Military personnel from Virginia